Anne-Marie McDermott is an American classical pianist and member of the Chamber Music Society of Lincoln Center. She is also the artistic director of the Bravo! Vail Valley Music Festival, the Ocean Reef Chamber Music Festival in Key Largo, Florida, and the Avila Chamber Music Celebration in Curaçao.

Biography
McDermott has received the Avery Fisher Career Development Award, the Andrew Wolf Memorial Chamber Music Award, the Joseph Kalichstein Piano Prize, the Paul A. Fish Memorial Prize, the Bruce Hungerford Memorial Prize, and the Mortimer Levitt Career Development Award for Women Artists.

McDermott's recordings include Prokofiev's complete piano sonatas (on Bridge Records) and George Gershwin's complete works for piano and orchestra. Her recording of Bach's English Suites and Partitas was named Gramophone Magazine'''s Editor's Choice. She has commissioned works by Charles Wuorinen (Fourth Piano Sonata'') and Clarice Assad, which were premiered in May 2009 at Town Hall in New York.

McDermott studied at the Manhattan School of Music. She was a member of the jury of the Van Cliburn International Piano Competition in 2022.

References

External links
 official website
 Chamber Music Society of Lincoln Center bio
 Bio at the Bravo! Vail Valley Music Festival
 Bio at Opus 3 Artists

American classical pianists
American women classical pianists
Living people
Manhattan School of Music alumni
20th-century American pianists
20th-century classical pianists
20th-century American women pianists
21st-century American pianists
21st-century classical pianists
21st-century American women pianists
Year of birth missing (living people)